Ceex Haci is a census-designated place (CDP) in Wood County, Wisconsin, United States. As of the 2020 census, it had a population of 89.

The community is in southern Wood County, on land of the Ho-Chunk Nation of Wisconsin.

References 

Populated places in Wood County, Wisconsin
Census-designated places in Wood County, Wisconsin
Census-designated places in Wisconsin
Ho-Chunk Nation of Wisconsin